The Complete Limelight Sessions is a collection of songs recorded by Canadian singer Shania Twain, before she signed a record deal with Mercury Nashville in 1993. It was released in North America on October 23, 2001 following the massive success of Come On Over. The album was promoted by remixes of "It's Alright", Twain's only song to chart on Billboards Hot Dance Club Play chart. "The Heart Is Blind" was released as a single to country radio, but did not get enough airplay to enter Billboards Hot Country Songs chart.

The tracks on this album were remastered by the original producer Harry Hinde, and released with Twain's permission; all other versions were released without consent from Twain or Hinde.

The songs from this album were previously released in July 2000 throughout Europe on the RWP Label as Wild & Wicked and originally came with a free poster. It charted on the UK Albums Chart at number 62 for two weeks. In the following years, the songs were released with varying tracklists (leaving out some songs and/or adding remixes) under various names, including Beginnings, On the Way or a song title from the album. None of these releases were official.

Track listing
All tracks produced by Harry Hinde.

Personnel
 Bob Babbitt – bass guitar
 Claude Desjardins – drums, bass guitar, keyboards, programming 
 Gord Heins - electric guitar
 Barry Keane – drums
 Paul Sabu – acoustic guitar
 Shania Twain – lead vocals, backing vocals

Charts

Certifications

Release history

References

Shania Twain albums
Demo albums
2000 compilation albums